Creggan may refer to several places:

Places

Northern Ireland 
Creggan, County Antrim, a small village and townland in County Antrim, Northern Ireland
 Kickhams Creggan GAC, a Gaelic sports club in County Antrim
Creggan, County Armagh, a small village in Northern Ireland
Creggan, County Tyrone, a townland in Northern Ireland
Creggan, Derry, a large housing estate in Derry, Northern Ireland

Republic of Ireland 
Creggan, County Westmeath, a townland in Noughaval civil parish, barony of Kilkenny West, County Westmeath

See also  
 Cregan